GeoGuessr is a browser-based geography game in which players guess locations from Google Street View imagery. The game features multiple game modes, including singleplayer and multiplayer competitions. Launched in 2013 by Anton Wallén, the game maintained a relatively small yet active player base until 2020, when the COVID-19 pandemic and social media brought a large influx of new players. In July 2022, the game had 40 million player accounts.

The game has been described as an educational tool for geography; players can learn and identify global geographical and cultural characteristics such as writing systems, architecture, driving practices, flags, vehicle registration plates, and flora.

Gameplay

Modes 
The "classic" GeoGuessr game mode consists of five rounds, each displaying a different street view location for the player to guess on a map. The player then receives a score of up to 5,000 points depending on how accurate their guess was, up to 25,000 points for a perfect game. Games may be user-generated or random.

Alternative game modes include Battle Royale, a multiplayer last man standing game; duels, a two-player head-to-head competition; streaks, where players identify countries, U.S. states, or world cities until they guess incorrectly; and explorer mode, a single-player game where medals are awarded for accuracy in individual countries.

In 2022, GeoGuessr acquired the geography quiz site Seterra, and implemented a quiz mode combining standard street view gameplay with trivia questions.

Interface 
The game's HUD primarily features the Google Street View imagery, as well as a compass. Users can control the movement, panning, and zooming of the image, although GeoGuessr allows any of these features to be disabled for harder gameplay. An inset map, using Google Maps's standard overlay, allows players to place a pin to make their guess.

Strategy 
Users may interpret their location from the photographs by reading road signage, finding the relative position of the Sun, identifying flora and soil types, and learning diacritics specific to particular writing systems. Players can also make use of Street View metadata to ascertain their location – for example, the Street View vehicle that captured imagery in Kruger National Park was unique in that it was green and had white roof racks.

Distribution 
GeoGuessr has both free and paid (subscription) memberships. The free mode restricts users to 5 minutes' game play every 15 minutes. Paid memberships are 1.99/month (billed annually) or US$3.49/month (billed monthly). Paid memberships include unlimited ad-free play, tournaments, ranked and unranked competitions, friend challenges and invitations, as well as the creation of customized maps.

Development 
The game was designed by Swedish IT consultant Anton Wallén in 2013. Wallen loved to visit faraway locations on Google Street View, and initially designed a program to generate a random location in Street View before deciding to add a competitive element.

The game's development took approximately 2 weeks' work, and uses the Backbone.js JavaScript library and the Google Maps API for games using Google Street View. Wallén posted the completed game to Google Chrome Experiments on 10 May 2013.

As well as English, the game is available in eight other languages: Dutch, French, German, Italian, Portuguese, Spanish, Swedish, and Turkish. Mobile apps for GeoGuessr are available on the Android and iOS platforms.

Reception 
The launch of the game in May 2013 was described as successful, with the game instantly going viral. Upon its release, the game was described as "insanely addictive." The start of the COVID-19 pandemic triggered a renewed interest in the game and it also had a second peak in March 2021.  Interest in the game has been propagated on platforms such as Reddit, YouTube, and Twitch, where notable users such as Ludwig, Georainbolt, and GeoWizard have recorded or streamed themselves playing the game.

The game has been cited as an educational tool by helping users to "develop critical skills to analyze geographical and cultural landscapes", and it has been suggested that the game could enhance geographical education within the classroom.

GeoGuessr users have criticized some of the photographic coverage used in the game. Locations such as Zanzibar used third-party and unofficial imagery, and GeoGuessr players have described some of this media as grainy, blurry, and over- or under-exposed. World Travel in 360, the organization that led the program to supply coverage of Zanzibar, stated that "[their] mapping is better than nothing".

The game has been the inspiration for several fan-made versions which use video game environments, such as the worlds of Fortnite, World of Warcraft, and Genshin Impact.

Footnotes

References

External links 
 

2013 video games
Android (operating system) games
Browser games
Geography educational video games
Google Street View
IOS games
Multiplayer video games
Battle royale games
Video games developed in Sweden
Video games with customizable avatars